A.O. Nea Ionia F.C, officially known as Nea Ionia (Athlitikos Omilos Neas Ionias), the "Athletic Union of New Ionia", is a Greek association football club based in the city of Nea Ionia, Greece. The club currently compete in the  Athens First Division.

History
At the end of the first decade of the previous century, the town of Nea Ionia had a lot of football clubs, each one with its separate football history. This in relation to its inhabitants' love of sport and especially football made the town known to the rest of Athens. A.O.Nea Ionia is today's most representative club of this refugee town, which is a merge product from football clubs of the town with the latter one having been accomplished in 2001. The basic colours of the team are yellow and blue. The football club was relegated from the Greek Football League 2 in 2014–2015 season, they finished 13th in Group 4 of the league table system. A change of ownership and a lot of financial problems find the club in the local championships for the new 2015–2016 football season.

Stadium
The club home ground was located in Nea Ionia, Athens. The municipal stadium of Nea Ionia is the home ground for A.O.Nea Ionia from the day of its foundation. It was built in 1962. In 2004 the whole stadium was extensively renovated and the pitch was replaced with a turf system of the very last generation. The dressing rooms have been renovated for the last time in 2007. The new facilities and stands built in 2015 were sponsored by the Greek government. The stadium is also used by A.E. Eleftheroupoli and P.A.O. Alsoupolis. The main entrance of the stadium is located at Olympias street in Nea Ionia, Athens.

Players

Current squad

Retired numbers

 (posthumous)

Notable former coaches

Notable former players

Personnel

Current Board

|}

References

External links

Official Website
A.O. Nea Ionia FC

Other Websites
Facebook webpage 

 
Football clubs in Athens
Football clubs in Attica
Association football clubs established in 1939
1939 establishments in Greece